This is a list of members of the Northern Territory Legislative Council from 26 October 1968 to 23 October 1971.

 The independent member for Fannie Bay and President of the Legislative Council, Harry Chan, died on 5 August 1969. Joe Fisher, a mining consultant and former appointed non-official member, was elected to replace him at a by-election on 20 September 1969.
 The Labor member for Nightcliff, Fred Drysdale, died on 15 December 1969. Independent member Norman Cooper was elected to replace him at a by-election on 31 January 1970.
 The independent member for Victoria River, Harold Brennan, resigned from the council for the third time on 10 December 1969, in this instance to contest the federal Division of Northern Territory at the 1969 Australian federal election. He was unsuccessful, and was re-elected at the by-election on 20 December 1969.

See also
1968 Northern Territory general election

References

Members of Northern Territory parliaments by term